Amal Hassan Salha (born 2 December 2000) is a Lebanese footballer who plays as a defender for Lebanese club Safa and the Lebanon national tea.

Club career
Salha joined Safa in 2019, playing 12 games in the 2019–20 season.

Honours 
Safa
 WAFF Women's Clubs Championship: 2022
 Lebanese Women's Football League: 2020–21

Lebanon
 WAFF Women's Championship third place: 2019

See also
 List of Lebanon women's international footballers

References

External links

 
 
 

2000 births
Living people
People from Baabda District
Lebanese women's footballers
Lebanon women's international footballers
Women's association football defenders
Lebanese Women's Football League players
Lebanon women's youth international footballers
Akhaa Ahli Aley FC (women) players
Safa WFC players